The 1986 Associate Members' Cup Final, known as the Freight Rover Trophy for sponsorship reasons, was the 3rd final of the domestic football cup competition for teams from the Third Division and Fourth Division. The final was played at Wembley Stadium, London on 24 May 1986, and was contested by Bristol City and Bolton Wanderers. Bristol City won the match 3–0.

Match details

External links
Official website

Associate Members' Cup Final 1986
EFL Trophy Finals
Associate Members' Cup Final 1986
Associate Members' Cup Final 1986
May 1986 sports events in the United Kingdom